Pancode is a small village in Ernakulam district of the state of Kerala in India. 
Pancode is just 16 km away from the prestigious Smart City Project and InfoPark, Kochi.

Neighbouring places of Pancode are

 Kadayiruppu – 2 km away
 Puthencruz – 3 km away
 Vadavucode – 2 km away
 Kolenchery – 3 km away
 Pattimattom – 3 km away
 Pallikkara – 7 km away
 Kizhakkambalam – 7 km away
 Perumbavoor – 16 km
 Moovattupuzha – 16 km
 Kakkanad – 16 km
 Tripunithura – 16 km

Government offices in Pancode are limited to an LP school, a post office, Milk Society, Cooperative Bank, veterinary hospital and a Maveli store. Subramnia Swamy Temple and Thiruvalukunnathu Temple, edassery kavu panchamoorty temple, Kalari sree durga temple are the four famous temples in Pancode. Iruppachira is the main junction of Pancode.

There is a private limited company named Sunlit Electro Controls. Herbal Isolates Private Limited, Symega Limited are other two major private institutions in the village.

Shashti Vritham in Pancode Subramanya Swami temple is famous. Makara Pooyam festival in Pancode temple is one of the spiritual attractions, and a lot of foreigners visit the village during the festive seasons. Village is adjacent to the Cochin Infopark.

References 

Villages in Ernakulam district